Madean Peak is a summit in Valdez–Cordova Census Area, Alaska, in the United States.

Madean Peak was named in the 1950s.

References

Landforms of Copper River Census Area, Alaska
Mountains of Alaska
Mountains of Unorganized Borough, Alaska